Ben Nevis is a mountain in Albert I Land at Spitsbergen, Svalbard. It is named after the Scottish mountain Ben Nevis.

References

Mountains of Spitsbergen